Arsénio Paixão Bano (born 1974 in Oecussi-Ambeno) is an East Timorese politician and the Vice-President of Fretilin, a post to which he was elected by the party's Central Committee in July 2007. He served in the government as Minister of Labor and Community Reinsertion until August 2007.

Bano is a member of Fretilin's Central Committee and its National Political Commission. He was elected to a seat in the National Parliament in the June 2007 parliamentary election as the third name on FRETILIN's candidate list.

References

People from Oecusse
Members of the National Parliament (East Timor)
1974 births
Living people
Fretilin politicians
Government ministers of East Timor